Dragasia is a small town located in the municipal unit of Tsotyli, western Kozani regional unit, itself in the Greek  region of Macedonia. In the late Ottoman period, it was inhabited by Vallahades; in the 1900 statistics of Vasil Kanchov, where the town appears under its Bulgarian name "Lislap'", it was inhabited by some 100 people all marked as "Greek Muslims".

References

Populated places in Kozani (regional unit)